Hatsuo (written:  or ) is a masculine Japanese given name. Notable people with the name include:

, Japanese World War II flying ace
, Japanese karateka

Japanese masculine given names